Paul Israel Pickman (born February 4, 1958) is an American film director, screenwriter, producer, newspaper publisher and columnist best known in United States of America for founding the Kackad (Каскад) pronounced Cascade in English) Russian newspaper.

Early life
Pickman graduated in 1981 from the Gerasimov Institute of Cinematography film school in Moscow, with a degree in journalism and art of film directing. He was from Minsk, Belarus. His father, Israel Pickman (Russian: Израиль Цуриелевич Пикман) was a filmmaker who was well known in the USSR and a graduate of the same film school. His mother was Mera Volchenok, a chemical engineer.

Career 
Pickman came to public prominence in Belarus in the 1980s, joining his father in Belarus film studios where he had interned since high school. Like many other Jewish Soviets, Pickman left the Soviet Union for the United States in 1989.

In America, Pickman reinvented himself, meeting his second wife, Nelly, in 1994. Pickman embarked on a new project as a scriptwriter, film director and producer with his friend Avi Abramov as director of photography. They created an international documentary called Peace Sounds Sweet. Released in 1995, the movie was well-received and won an award at the Philadelphia International Film Festival. Shortly after, Pickman and his wife decided to launch Baltimore's Kackad Russian Newspaper in June 1995. Pickman serves as the newspaper publisher and columnist.

Pickman plays a pivotal role as a spokesman for the Baltimore Russian and Jewish Soviet immigrant community.

1980s
 1987 - Prize and diploma from All Byelorussian Festival of Young Cinematographers, Minsk, USSR, for documentary, Long Live the Wind
 1988 - First prize and Diploma from "National Festival of Advertisements", Kishinev, USSR, for films, Save the Bread, Old man, Old Woman and Kilowatt
 1989 - TV shows for National Broadcasting, Moscow, USSR, for These Non-Understandable Old Men, House at the Road.
 1988-89 - Vice President, Young Cinematographer's Union, Minsk, USSR, 1988-1989

1990s
 1994 - Development Stages of Several film projects with McDonagh-Davis Newborn A Quante Associates including Telly Award-winner The Loneliest Journey, camera, production, editing.
 1995–Present - President Goubernia Corp., Editor in Chief of the Cascade Russian newspaper
 Editor, Milner-Fenvick Video Company
 Film Director, Cinema Verite
 Songs and Music of Russian Jews 
 From Baltimore with Love 
 Peace Sounds Sweet
Diploma of Philadelphia International Film Festival, participate in New York 17th Independent Film Market and Leipzig International Film Festival

2000s
 in 2002 Kackad adapted the domain name kackad.com and expanded to an online market to capture the world audience.

2010s
In 2014, Paul Pickman published a book called New Year in September.

References

1958 births
Living people
Film people from Minsk
Belarusian Jews
Soviet emigrants to the United States
American people of Belarusian-Jewish descent
American male non-fiction writers
American newspaper editors
People from Baltimore
Film directors from Maryland